Enrico Luzi (27 September 1919 – 18 October 2011) was an Italian actor. He appeared in more than sixty films from 1941 to 1980.

Selected filmography

References

External links 

1919 births
2011 deaths
Italian male film actors